Below is a listing of public and private schools for Lexington, Kentucky, USA.

Public schools

The city is served by the Fayette County Public Schools district. The district serves all of Fayette County, which is coextensive with the city of Lexington.

Elementary schools
Arlington Elementary School
Ashland Elementary School
Athens-Chilesburg Elementary School
Booker T. Washington Academy
Breckinridge Elementary School
Brenda Cowan Elementary School
Cardinal Valley Elementary School
Cassidy Elementary School
Clays Mill Elementary School
Coventry Oak Elementary School
Deep Springs Elementary School
Dixie Elementary School 
Garden Springs Elementary School
Garrett Morgan Elementary School
Glendover Global Studies Elementary School
Harrison Elementary School
James Lane Allen Elementary School
Julius Marks Elementary School
Landsowne Elementary School
Liberty Elementary School
Mary Todd Elementary School
Maxwell Spanish Immersion Magnet Elementary School
Meadowthorpe Elementary School
Millcreek Elementary School
Northern Elementary School
Picadome Elementary School
Rosa Parks Elementary School
Russell Cave Elementary School
Sandersville Elementary School
Southern Elementary School
Squires Elementary School
Stonewall Elementary School
Tates Creek Elementary School
Veterans Park Elementary School
Wellington Elementary School
William Wells Brown Elementary School
Yates Elementary School

Middle schools
 Beaumont Middle School 
 Bryan Station Traditional Magnet Middle School
 Crawford Middle School
 E.J. Hayes Middle School 
 Jessie M. Clark Middle School 
 Leestown Middle School 
 Lexington Traditional Magnet School (LTMS)
 Morton Middle School 
 Southern Middle School
 Tates Creek Middle School 
 Winburn Middle School

4-8 schools
 School for the Creative and Performing Arts at Bluegrass (SCAPA)

High schools
 Bryan Station High School
 Frederick Douglass High School 
 Henry Clay High School 
 Lafayette High School  
 Locust Trace AgriScience Center  
 Paul Laurence Dunbar High School 
 Tates Creek High School
 Eastside Technical Center
 Southside Technical Center
 STEAM Academy

Private schools

Elementary schools
 Community Montessori
 Lexington Christian Academy
 Lexington Montessori School
 The Lexington School
 Lexington Universal Academy
 Mars Hill Academy
 Providence Montessori
 Redwood Cooperative School
 Sayre School
 Saints Peter and Paul Regional Catholic School
 Trinity Christian Academy

Middle schools
 Blue Grass Baptist School
 Christ the King Catholic School
 Lexington Christian Academy
 The Lexington School
 Lexington Universal Academy
 Mars Hill Academy
 Mary Queen of the Holy Rosary Catholic School
 Redwood Cooperative School
 Saints Peter and Paul Regional Catholic School
 Sayre School 
 Sphinx Academy
 Trinity Christian Academy

High schools
 Blue Grass Baptist School
 Lexington Christian Academy
 Lexington Catholic High School
 Mars Hill Academy
 Montessori High School of Kentucky
 Sayre School
 Sphinx Academy
 Trinity Christian Academy

Area colleges and universities
 Asbury University (in Wilmore)
 Asbury Theological Seminary (in Wilmore)
 Berea College (in Berea)
 Bluegrass Community and Technical College
 Centre College (in Danville)
 Eastern Kentucky University (in Richmond)
 Georgetown College (in Georgetown)
 Indiana Wesleyan University (Lexington campus)
 Kentucky State University (in Frankfort)
 Lexington Theological Seminary
 National College
 Midway University (campuses in Midway and Lexington)
 Spencerian College
 Sullivan University
 Transylvania University
 University of Kentucky

External links
 Fayette County Public Schools
Bryan Station High School
 Frederick Douglass High School
Henry Clay High School
Lafayette High School
 Paul Laurence Dunbar High School
 School for the Creative and Performing Arts at Bluegrass (SCAPA)
 STEAM Academy
 Tates Creek High School
 Blue Grass Baptist School
 Christ the King Catholic School
 Community Montessori
 Lexington Montessori School
 The Lexington School
 Mary Queen of the Holy Rosary Catholic School
 Midway University, Lexington campus
 Montessori High School of Kentucky
 Providence Montessori
 Redwood Cooperative School
 Saints Peter and Paul Regional Catholic School
 Sphinx Academy

Lexington